Antigua and Barbuda is an island nation made up of: Antigua island which is divided into six parishes; and of the two dependencies of Barbuda island and Redonda island. 

Although Barbuda and Redonda are called dependencies, they are integral parts of the state, making them essentially administrative divisions. Dependency is simply their title.

Redonda was annexed into Saint John Parish and unlike Barbuda, is not an autonomous island.

History 
Antigua's first-level administrative divisions were based on Divisions, which were later joined together to form the island's five parishes. Prior to the creation of parishes, Divisions served as the basis for Antigua's administrative divisions. Despite the fact that divisions have never been eliminated, major divisions have now taken over the role of becoming Antigua's second-level administrative divisions.

On January 11, 1692, the five founding parishes of Antigua and Barbuda—Saint John, Saint Mary, Saint Paul, and Saint Philip and Saint Peter—were formally organized into what are now known as the Parishes of Antigua and Barbuda. In 1725, the parish of Saint Peter was divided into the parish of Saint Peter as it is known today and the parish of Saint George.

The office of "justice" served as the top government official in parishes in the past; but, de facto, this role is no longer held in any parishes. Each parish also had a vestry.

List

See also 
 ISO 3166-2:AG
 List of Caribbean First-level Subdivisions by Total Area
 Commonwealth Local Government Forum-Americas

References

External links 

 UNccd.int: Source of accurate Antigua and Barbuda area figures

 
.
Subdivisions of Antigua and Barbuda
Antigua and Barbuda, Parishes
Antigua and Barbuda 1
Parishes, Antigua and Barbuda
Antigua and Barbuda geography-related lists